Blue Parlan is an album by American jazz pianist Horace Parlan featuring performances recorded in 1978 and released on the Danish-based  SteepleChase label.

Reception

Ron Wynn for AllMusic states "Parlan gets down in this striking trio outing".

Track listing
 "Goodbye Pork Pie Hat" (Charles Mingus) – 8:05
 "Sunspots" (Austin Wells) – 6:13
 "Firm Roots" (Cedar Walton) – 4:32
 "Monk's Mood" (Thelonious Monk) – 5:53
 "Neicy" (Frank Strozier) – 5:49
 "Night Mist Blues" (Ahmad Jamal) – 4:43
 "Cynthia's Dance" (Horace Parlan) – 6:06
 "There's No Greater Love" (Isham Jones, Marty Symes) – 4:34

Personnel
Horace Parlan – piano
Wilbur Little – bass
Dannie Richmond – drums

References

SteepleChase Records albums
Horace Parlan albums
1978 albums